For an optical fiber, a step-index profile is a refractive index profile characterized by a uniform refractive index within the core and a sharp decrease in refractive index at the core-cladding interface so that the cladding is of a lower refractive index.  The step-index profile corresponds to a power-law index profile with the profile parameter approaching infinity. The step-index profile is used in most single-mode fibers and some multimode fibers.

A step-index fiber is characterized by the core and cladding refractive indices n1 and n2 and the core and cladding radii a and b. Examples of standard core and cladding diameters 2a/2b are 8/125, 50/125, 62.5/125, 85/125, or 100/140 (units of µm). The fractional refractive-index change  .

Step-index optical fiber is generally made by doping high-purity fused silica glass (SiO2) with different concentrations of materials like titanium, germanium, or boron.

Modal dispersion in a step index optical fiber is given by

where
  is the fractional index of refraction
  is the refractive index of core
  is the length of the optical fiber under observation
 is the speed of light.

See also
Graded-index fiber
Critical angle
Numerical aperture

References

Fiber optics